B. malayanus may refer to:

 Bathysauropsis malayanus, a fish species in the genus Bathysauropsis and the family Ipnopidae
 Beloniscus malayanus, a harvestman species in the genus Beloniscus and the family Epedanidae

See also
 Malayanus